Sith Academy could refer to:

The Shadow Academy
The Trayus Academy
The Sith Academy on Korriban that was destroyed by Darth Revan.